The Sims Hotel was a historic hotel in Plumerville, Arkansas.  Located in the town center, it was the last surviving remnant of the town's early heyday as a railroad community.  Built in 1860s as a private residence, it was converted to a hotel when the railroad arrived in the 1870s, and was decorated with then-fashionable Gothic gingerbread trim on its two-story porch.  It was the only railroad-oriented hotel to survive fires that swept the city's downtown in the early 20th century.

The building was listed on the National Register of Historic Places in 1975.  It has apparently been demolished, and was delisted in 2000.

See also
National Register of Historic Places listings in Conway County, Arkansas

References

Hotel buildings on the National Register of Historic Places in Arkansas
Hotel buildings completed in 1881
Buildings and structures in Conway County, Arkansas
Hotels in Arkansas
1881 establishments in Arkansas
Former National Register of Historic Places in Arkansas